Rafał Szymon Grupiński (born 26 September 1952, in Wronki) is a Polish politician. He was elected to the Sejm on 25 September 2005, getting 8,168 votes in 36 Kalisz district as a candidate from the Civic Platform list.

See also
Members of Polish Sejm 2005-2007

External links
Rafał Grupiński - parliamentary page - includes declarations of interest, voting record, and transcripts of speeches.

Civic Platform politicians
Freedom Union (Poland) politicians
1952 births
Living people
Members of the Polish Sejm 2005–2007
Members of the Polish Sejm 2007–2011
Members of the Polish Sejm 2011–2015
Members of the Polish Sejm 2015–2019
Members of the Polish Sejm 2019–2023
Adam Mickiewicz University in Poznań alumni
Recipients of the Gold Cross of Merit (Poland)